Zellberg is a municipality in the Schwaz district in the Austrian state of Tyrol.

Geography
Zellberg lies in the upper Ziller valley on the left bank of the Ziller next to Zell am Ziller.

References

Cities and towns in Schwaz District